Kenraalimajuri (Major General) is an officer's rank in Finland, immediately above  (Brigadier General) and below  (Lieutenant General). In Finland, the rank is translated as major general. In Finland a  typically commands a corps or army chief of staff.

History and related ranks

Origin 
The rank was originally a pure staff officers' rank used for those who served a general. Those staff servants were named Sergeant Major Generals. The sergeant part was later dropped.

See also 
 Finnish military ranks

Military ranks of Finland

fi:Kenraalimajuri